Craniophora pontica is a moth of the  family Noctuidae. It is found from the southern Balkans through the Near East and parts of the Middle East to Afghanistan. In the Levant it has been recorded from Lebanon and Israel.

Adults are on wing from April to May and in September. There are two generations per year.

The larvae feed on Fraxinus species.

External links

Fauna Europaea
Lepiforum.de

Acronictinae
Moths of Europe
Moths of Asia
Moths of the Middle East
Taxa named by Otto Staudinger
Moths described in 1879